Urmetovo (Ürmät) is a rural locality (a selo) and the administrative centre of Urmetovsky Selsoviet, Ilishevsky District, Bashkortostan, Russia. The population was 654 as of 2010. There are 6 streets.

Geography 
Urmetovo is located 21 km southwest of Verkhneyarkeyevo (the district's administrative centre) by road. Rsayevo is the nearest rural locality.

References 

Rural localities in Ilishevsky District